Charles Beare  (born 1937) is a British violin expert, craftsman and dealer. In 2001, the New York Times described Beare as "the most esteemed authenticator in the world." In 2002, CNN characterized him as the "world's most respected violin dealer" and "king of all violin dealers." Fourth of five generations of a family of violin experts, he was the Director of the London-based John & Arthur Beare Ltd, before resigning in 2012.  He is now a Director of the family firm Beare Violins Ltd.

Career
The step-son of William Beare, Beare was born in 1937. He attended National Service before he began studying violin making in 1958. Beare studied first in Germany at the Mittenwald School before travelling to the United States at the invitation of Rembert Wurlitzer, training under Simone Fernando Sacconi. In 1961, he returned to the United Kingdom, where his family had been in the trade for three generations, initially as Beare, Goodwin & Co. from 1892, then incorporated as J & A Beare Ltd. in 1954.  During his time at the head of the family's business he became an authority on authenticating and identifying violins as well as being one of the only tradesman entrusted to repair and maintain instruments by such artists as Yehudi Menuhin, Isaac Stern, Nathan Milstein, Jacqueline du Pré, Pinchas Zukerman, Mstislav Rostropovich and Yo-Yo Ma; he also built up a workshop team of enviable reputation.

In 1998 J & A Beare Ltd changed its name to Beare Violins Ltd  and gave its old name to a new venture formed jointly with another London-based firm.  Beare was a director of both companies but resigned as a director of J & A Beare in November 2012, and from his subsequent role as consultant in September 2013.  He returned to work in November 2014 through the original family company, Beare Violins Ltd, and now concentrates primarily on writing certificates of authenticity for instruments of the violin family. It is estimated that Beare has personally signed more than 5,000 certificates of authenticity throughout his career.

Beare is an honorary member (and former president) of the EILA (l’Entente Internationale des Maîtres Luthiers et Archetiers d’Art), a member of the BADA (British Antique Dealers Association), an honorary fellow of the Royal Academy of Music and was made an honorary citizen of Cremona, Italy, following the highly successful 1987 Stradivari exhibition. He was awarded an OBE in 2004 for services to the Music Industry.

Family
Beare's sons, Peter and Freddie, are the fifth generation in the Beare family to take up the trade.

References

1937 births
Living people
Violin dealers
Date of birth missing (living people)
Bowed string instrument makers
British musical instrument makers
Officers of the Order of the British Empire